Anderson Emanuel Castelo Branco Cruz (born 9 April 1996) is an Angolan professional footballer who plays as a winger for Petro de Luanda on loan from the Portuguese club Rio Ave, and the Angola national team.

Club career
Born in Luanda, Cruz moved to Lisboa at the age of four and finished his formation with Varzim S.C. He made his senior debut with the reserves in the 2015–16 season.

On 2 February 2016, Cruz signed for Tercera División side Verín CF, on loan from Ourense CF. He returned to his parent club for the 2016–17 campaign, scoring ten goals and achieving promotion to the fourth level.

On 26 August 2017 Cruz moved to Segunda División B side Rápido de Bouzas, still owned by Ourense. The following 18 January, he signed a four-year contract with La Liga side Deportivo Alavés, being immediately loaned to parent club NK Rudeš until the end of the season.

Cruz made his professional debut on 11 February 2018, starting in a 2–2 away draw against NK Lokomotiva. Five days later he scored his first professional goal, as he netted the first in a 2–0 home win against NK Inter Zaprešić.

On 25 May 2018, Cruz was loaned to Ligue 2 side FC Sochaux-Montbéliard until the end of the 2018–19 season. On 27 July of the following year, he moved to Segunda División side CF Fuenlabrada also in a temporary deal.

On 1 September 2020, Cruz signed for Liga Nacional de Fútbol Profesional side Club Bolívar. He made four Copa Libertadores and four Copa Sudamericana appearances for the Bolivian side.

On 28 January 2021, Cruz returned to Portugal and signed a four-and-a-half-year deal with Rio Ave.

In January 2022, Cruz was loaned to Angolan club Petro de Luanda and the loan was subsequently renewed for the 2022–23 season.

International career
Cruz debuted with the Angola national team in a 2–0 2021 Africa Cup of Nations qualification win over Gabon on 29 March 2021.

References

External links

1996 births
Footballers from Luanda
Living people
Angolan footballers
Angola international footballers
Association football wingers
Ourense CF players
Rápido de Bouzas players
Deportivo Alavés players
NK Rudeš players
FC Sochaux-Montbéliard players
CF Fuenlabrada footballers
Club Bolívar players
Rio Ave F.C. players
Atlético Petróleos de Luanda players
Campeonato de Portugal (league) players
Segunda División B players
Croatian Football League players
Ligue 2 players
Championnat National 3 players
Tercera División players
Primeira Liga players
Girabola players
Angolan expatriate footballers
Expatriate footballers in Portugal
Angolan expatriate sportspeople in Portugal
Expatriate footballers in Spain
Angolan expatriate sportspeople in Spain
Expatriate footballers in Croatia
Angolan expatriate sportspeople in Croatia
Expatriate footballers in France
Angolan expatriate sportspeople in France
Expatriate footballers in Bolivia
Angolan expatriate sportspeople in Bolivia